László Majtényi (born 30 November 30, 1950) is a Hungarian jurist, university professor and doctor of the Hungarian Academy of Sciences (MTA). His field of research was initially the law of the sea, and later the institution of ombudsmen.

Education 
In 1975, he graduated from the Faculty of Law of the Eötvös Loránd University.

Career 
From 1995 to 2001 he was Data Protection Commissioner (Ombudsman), in 2008-2009 he was the Chairman of the National Radio and Television Board (ORTT). President of the Károly Eötvös Institute of Public Policy, established by the Soros Foundation. A leading candidate in the 2017 presidential election, he was defeated by János Áder in the second round.

References

1950 births
20th-century Hungarian lawyers
Living people
Candidates for President of Hungary